Twin Lakes in Mono County, California can refer to:
 Twin Lakes, Mono County, California, a census-designated place surrounding the Twin Lakes southwest of Bridgeport